"Everybody" is a song by American rapper Logic. It serves as the lead single from his third studio album Everybody, and was released through Visionary Music Group and Def Jam Recordings on March 31, 2017. The song was produced by Logic, 6ix and PSTMN. On October 12, 2018, the soundtrack for the film The Hate U Give featured the song.

Background
Logic first teased the song on January 1, 2016, on Snapchat. In an interview with Genius, Logic spoke on the creation process behind the song, he said:

This was the first song that I wrote for the album, this was like two years ago, which is crazy to say that. I just knew it was something that I wanted to say. I just felt compelled, and I didn’t even really still know about the whole concept of the album yet, like I had this idea in my mind, but this is just something I really needed to say.

Chart performance
"Everybody" debuted at number 59 on the Billboard Hot 100 and the Canadian Hot 100 for the chart dated April 22, 2017. "Everybody" is Logic's third appearance on the Hot 100 following "Sucker for Pain" and "Flexicution". On March 15, 2018, the single was certified platinum by the Recording Industry Association of America (RIAA) for combined sales and streaming-equivalent units of over a million units in the United States.

Charts

Certifications

References

External links

2017 singles
2017 songs
Logic (rapper) songs
Def Jam Recordings singles
Songs written by Logic (rapper)